George Lawrence Mabson was a member of the North Carolina House of Representatives and the North Carolina State Senate, as well as the North Carolina Constitutional Convention of 1875. 

Mabson was the son of a black woman, Eliza Moore, and a prominent white man, George W. Mabson, in Wilmington, North Carolina. His brother was William P. Mabson, who was also a politician.  In the 1850s, he was sent to Boston to attend school. During the Civil War, Mabson first served in the United States Navy and then joined Company G, 5th Massachusetts Cavalry Regiment in February 1864 and mustered out in Clarksville, Texas, a full Command Sergeant. After earning a degree from Howard University Law School, he became the first black lawyer in North Carolina. In 1870, he unsuccessfully ran for a seat in the United States House of Representatives.

He was the nephew of William B. Gould and correspond with him frequently during the Civil War. In the 1880s, a child who was likely either his son or nephew lived with and worked for Gould in Dedham, Massachusetts.

He died on October 4, 1885 in Wilmington, North Carolina and was buried at Pine Forest Cemetery in Wilmington.

References

Works cited

1885 deaths
Burials in North Carolina
People from North Carolina
Howard University School of Law alumni
United States Navy sailors
Union Army non-commissioned officers